Sílvio Rodrigues Pereira Júnior (born 4 May 1994), commonly known as Silvio, is a Brazilian professional footballer who plays as a forward for Liga 1 club Persikabo 1973.

Club career
In February 2016, he signed a contract with the Ukrainian Premier League, Chornomorets Odesa.

On 9 August 2020, Sílvio signed a contract with Shamakhi until the end of the 2020–21 season.

On 10 June 2022, Juninho signed a contract with Persebaya Surabaya for 2022-23 Liga 1 season

References

External links
Profile at Zerozero

1994 births
Living people
People from Ribeirão Preto
Brazilian footballers
Association football forwards
Batatais Futebol Clube players
Brazilian expatriate footballers
FC Chornomorets Odesa players
KF Vllaznia Shkodër players
FC ViOn Zlaté Moravce players
Shamakhi FK players
Al Dhaid SC players
Masafi Club players
Persebaya Surabaya players
Slovak Super Liga players
Ukrainian Premier League players
Kategoria Superiore players
Azerbaijan Premier League players
UAE First Division League players
Liga 1 (Indonesia) players
Expatriate footballers in Albania
Expatriate footballers in Slovakia
Expatriate footballers in Ukraine
Expatriate footballers in Azerbaijan
Expatriate footballers in the United Arab Emirates
Expatriate footballers in Indonesia
Brazilian expatriate sportspeople in Albania
Brazilian expatriate sportspeople in Slovakia
Brazilian expatriate sportspeople in Ukraine
Brazilian expatriate sportspeople in Azerbaijan
Brazilian expatriate sportspeople in the United Arab Emirates
Brazilian expatriate sportspeople in Indonesia 
Footballers from São Paulo (state)